Rank comparison of non-commissioned officers and enlisted personnel for air forces of African states.

Other ranks

See also
 Comparative air force officer ranks of Africa
 Comparative army enlisted ranks of Africa
 Comparative navy enlisted ranks of Africa

References

Military comparisons
Air force ranks